The Pinto Kid is a 1928 American silent Western film directed by Louis King and starring Buzz Barton, Frank Rice and Jim Welch.

Cast
 Buzz Barton as David 'Red' Hepner 
 Frank Rice as Hank Robbins 
 Jim Welch as Andy Bruce 
 Gloria Lee as Janet Bruce 
 Milburn Morante as Pat Logan 
 Hugh Trevor as Dan Logan 
 Bill Patton as Rufe Sykes 
 Walter Shumway as Bert Lowery

References

Bibliography
 Pitts, Michael R. Western Movies: A Guide to 5,105 Feature Films. McFarland, 2012.

External links
 

1928 films
1928 Western (genre) films
American black-and-white films
Films directed by Louis King
Film Booking Offices of America films
Silent American Western (genre) films
1920s English-language films
1920s American films